William Thorneycroft Lofts (March 15, 1902 – January 27, 1978) was a Transvaal Colony-born garage owner and political figure in Saskatchewan. He represented Meadow Lake from 1948 to 1952 Legislative Assembly of Saskatchewan as a Liberal.

He was born in Johannesburg, the son of John W. Lofts and Edith Curry. His father served with the British during the Boer War. Lofts came to Canada with his family in 1907. In 1926, he married Lillian Younger. Lofts was a dealer for Ford and International Harvester. He served as chair of the local school board. Lofts lived in Glaslyn, Saskatchewan.

References 

Saskatchewan Liberal Party MLAs
British expatriates in the Transvaal Colony
British emigrants to Canada
1902 births
1978 deaths
20th-century Canadian politicians